Zaramin-e Sofla (also Romanized as Zarāmīn-e Soflá and Zaramin Sofla; also known as Zaramin and Zarāmīn-e Pā’īn) is a village in Fazl Rural District, Zarrin Dasht District, Nahavand County, Hamadan Province, Iran. At the 2006 census, its population was 1,625, in 428 families.

References 

Populated places in Nahavand County